Thomas Patrick Payne (born April 2, 1984) is a United States Army Delta Force sergeant major and instructor, who was awarded the Medal of Honor for his actions during a hostage rescue mission in an area of northern Iraq controlled by the Islamic State. Payne is currently the only recipient of the Medal of Honor for Operation Inherent Resolve.

Early life and education
Payne was born on April 2, 1984, and grew up in Batesburg-Leesville and Lugoff, South Carolina, graduating from Lugoff-Elgin High School in 2002. His father is a policeman, and he has two brothers, one of whom also serves in the Army and the other in the United States Air Force.

Army career

After high school, Payne enlisted in the United States Army as an infantryman on July 25, 2002, completing One Station Unit Training, the Basic Airborne Course, and the Ranger Indoctrination Program (now known as the Ranger Assessment and Selection Program) throughout 2002 and 2003 at Fort Benning, Georgia.

Payne was then assigned as a rifleman to Company A, 1st Battalion, 75th Ranger Regiment, where he also served as a sniper and sniper team leader until November 2007, where he then completed a specialized selection course for assignment to the United States Army Special Operations Command's 1st Special Forces Operational Detachment – Delta at Fort Bragg, North Carolina. Since then, he has served within USASOC as a special operations team member, assistant team sergeant, team sergeant, and instructor.

In 2010, then-Staff Sergeant Payne was wounded in Afghanistan from a grenade blast, from which he made a complete recovery and eventually returned to duty.

In 2012, then-Sergeant First Class Payne and his then teammate, Master Sergeant Kevin Foutz, won the Best Ranger Competition in Fort Benning, Georgia.

Payne has been deployed 17 times in support of Operation Enduring Freedom, Operation Iraqi Freedom, Operation New Dawn, Operation Inherent Resolve, and Operation Resolute Support, and to the United States Africa Command area of responsibility.

Payne is a graduate of numerous military schools and courses, including Basic Airborne Course; Ranger Indoctrination Program; Ranger School; Sniper Course; Basic Leader Course; Basic Demolition Course; Advanced Demolition Course; Advanced Land Navigation; Survive, Evasion, Resistance and Escape; Free Fall Parachutist; Advanced Leader Course; Jumpmaster Course; Free Fall Jumpmaster Course; Joint Military Tandem Master Course; Senior Leader Course; Defense Language Institute (French); Special Forces Sniper Course; and Joint Special Operations Senior Enlisted Academy.

As of June 2022, Payne, Lieutenant Colonel William D. Swenson, Sergeant Major Matthew O. Williams and Master Sergeant Earl D. Plumlee are the only Medal of Honor recipients still on active duty.

Medal of Honor

Payne was awarded the Medal of Honor on September 11, 2020, for his actions on October 22, 2015, during a hostage rescue at an Islamic State prison compound in the north of the town of Hawija, Kirkuk Province, Iraq, in support of Combined Joint Task Force – Operation Inherent Resolve. The joint operation, conducted with the Kurdish CTG (Counter-Terrorism Group), resulted in the rescue of 70 Iraqi prisoners with one American casualty, Delta Force Master Sergeant Joshua Wheeler. Payne received the Medal of Honor from President Donald Trump during a ceremony at the White House. He is the first living Delta Force member to receive the Medal of Honor, the third Delta Force recipient after Master Sergeant Gary Gordon and Sergeant First Class Randy Shughart who died in the 1993 Battle of Mogadishu, and the first Medal of Honor recipient for Operation Inherent Resolve.

Rescue operation
The task force prioritized the hostage rescue mission to prevent the execution of 70 prisoners after learning that new graves had been dug at the complex. The mission, which included Kurdish soldiers, commenced in the pre-dawn darkness with the landing of the team in CH-47 Chinook helicopters. The Kurdish troops unsuccessfully tried to blast open the prison wall with explosives which caused the enemy to open fire almost immediately. The Americans entered the complex by climbing over the wall and Master Sergeant Joshua Wheeler was killed by ISIS gunfire. Payne and the team suppressed resistance at one prison building, cut the locks on cell doors, and freed 37 hostages.

An intense firefight was underway in a second building, which had started to burn. Payne and other US soldiers responded to radio calls for assistance and aided Kurdish soldiers who were pinned down at the second building. Amid gunfire, Payne and another soldier climbed a ladder to the roof of the building but could not gain entry. From the roof, they engaged enemy forces on the ground with gunfire and grenades before returning to the ground to seek another entry point after an ISIS fighter detonated a suicide vest to try to collapse the building. Payne and a Kurdish commando entered the burning building and faced intense gunfire from enemy combatants in a back room. Payne cut one door lock but retreated due to the heavy smoke and gunfire. A Kurdish commando tried to cut the second lock but failed. Payne entered the area again and cut the last lock, freeing 30 additional prisoners. As the building was collapsing, the order was given to evacuate. Payne stayed to direct everyone out, being the last person to exit  after re-entering twice to ensure that no one was left behind. Payne and the team then formed a protective barrier as the hostages ran to the extraction helicopters.

Medal of Honor citation

Personal life

Payne graduated from Norwich University in 2017 with a Bachelor of Science degree in strategic studies and defense analysis. As of June 2021, Payne is stationed at Fort Bragg, North Carolina, where he lives with his wife and three children. His wife, Alison, is a nurse who served at St. Joseph's Hospital in Long Island, where she helped care for patients during the COVID-19 outbreak between April and May 2020. They met at Lake Murray while he was recovering from his wounds in South Carolina from a grenade blast in Afghanistan in 2010.

Awards and decorations

Payne has received:

Payne and his partner, MSG Kevin Foutz also won the Best Ranger Competition in 2012.

See also
 List of Delta Force members
 List of operations conducted by Delta Force 
 List of post-Vietnam War Medal of Honor recipients

References

United States Army Medal of Honor recipients
Delta Force
1984 births
Living people
Military personnel from South Carolina
Norwich University alumni
People from Batesburg-Leesville, South Carolina
People from Lugoff, South Carolina